Corrado Hérin (pron. fr. IPA:  - 4 August 1966 – 31 March 2019) was an Italian luger and mountain bike racer. He died on 31 March 2019 in an ultralight flight accident in Torgnon, Italy.

Biography 
Originally from Fénis, Aosta Valley, he competed from the mid-1980s to the early 1990s. A natural track luger, he won four medals at the FIL World Luge Natural Track Championships with two gold in the doubles (1986, 1992) and two silvers at the 1990 event (singles, doubles).

Hérin also won three medals in the men's doubles event at the FIL European Luge Natural Track Championships with one gold (1993) and two silvers (1985, 1987).

Hérin was involved with mountain biking during his career in luge during the 1990s, winning a bronze medal in the downhill event at the 1994 World Mountain Biking Championships in Vail, Colorado. He remained active in mountain biking from 1997 to 2002 after retiring from luge.

He won the UCI mountain bike Downhill World cup in 1997 racing for the Sintesi Verlicchi team. In 2016 he returned to racing at the age of 50 and won the Mountain Bike Downhill Masters World Championships in Val Di Sole, Italy.

References

Sources
 Natural track European Championships results 1970–2006.
 Natural track World Championships results: 1979–2007

External links
 Official website 
 

1966 births
2019 deaths
Italian male cyclists
Italian male lugers
Aviators killed in aviation accidents or incidents in Italy
Downhill mountain bikers
Sportspeople from Aosta Valley
Italian mountain bikers
Victims of aviation accidents or incidents in 2019